Neil Duxbury is a British legal scholar.

Education 
He received his LLB degree from the University of Hull Law School in 1984. He received his PhD from London School of Economics in 1988.

Career 
Duxbury is a professor of English law at the London School of Economics. He was elected as a Fellow of the British Academy in 2010.

Bibliography 
Some of his books are:

 Patterns of American Jurisprudence 
 The Nature and Authority of Precedent 
 Elements of Legislation 
 Jurists and Judges: An Essay on Influence 
 Random Justice: On Lotteries And Legal Decision Making 
 Frederick Pollock and the English Juristic Tradition

References 

Year of birth missing (living people)
Living people
British legal scholars
Alumni of the University of Hull
Alumni of the London School of Economics
Academics of the London School of Economics